Gbala is a surname common borne in African. Notable people with the surname include:

 Gbala O Moses, Nigerian academician and clergyman hailed from Ondo State.
 David Gbala, Liberian politician
 Patrick Gbala (born 1993), Ivorian footballer

Surnames of African origin